Micrablepharus is a small genus of lizards endemic to South America.

Species
There are two species:
Micrablepharus atticolus 
Micrablepharus maximiliani 

Nota bene: A binomial authority in parentheses indicates that the species was originally described in a different genus, in this case a genus other than Micrablepharus.

Etymology
The specific name, maximiliani, is in honor of German naturalist Prince Maximilian of Wied-Neuwied.

References

Further reading
Boettger O (1885). "Liste von Reptilien und Batrachiern aus Paraguay ". Zeitschrift für Naturwissenschaften (Halle) 58: 213–248. (Micrablepharus, new genus, p. 217). (in German and Latin).
Boulenger GA (1885). Catalogue of the Lizards in the British Museum (Natural History). Second Edition. Volume II ... Teiidæ ... London: Trustees of the British Museum (Natural History). (Taylor and Francis, printers). xiii + 497 pp. + Plates I-XXIV. (Genus Micrablepharus, p. 426; species M. maximiliani, pp. 426–427).
Reinhardt J, Lütken C (1862). "Bidrag til Kundskab om Brasiliens Padder og Krybdr. Förste Afdeling: Padderne og Öglerne ". Videnskabelige Meddelelser fra den naturhistoriske Forening i Kjöbenhavn 1861 (10-15): 143–242. (Gymnophthalmus maximiliani, new species, pp. 211–214 + Plate V, figures 6a-6g). (in Danish).
Rodrigues MT (1996). "A New Species of Lizard, Genus Micrablepharus (Squamata: Gymnophthalmidae), from Brazil ". Herpetologica 52 (4): 535–541. (Micrablepharus atticolus, new species).

 
Lizards of South America
Lizard genera
Taxa named by Oskar Boettger